The Kellogg's Nutri-Grain Ironman and Ironwoman Series is a professional iron man and iron women racing series, born out of surf livesaving.

The series has over the years taken place over various locations, including:
 Smiths Beach in the Margaret River region of South West Western Australia;
 Newcastle Beach in Newcastle, New South Wales;
 North Cronulla Beach in Cronulla, New South Wales;
 Coolum Beach on the Sunshine Coast of Queensland; and
 Surfers Paradise on the Gold Coast of Queensland.
The current series champions from the 2021/22 season are Alistair (Ali) Day of Surfers Paradise and Harriet Brown of the best iron personBMD Northcliffe, Queensland.

History
Professional ironman racing was born out of the movie The Coolangatta Gold which featured multiple Australian Ironman champion Grant Kenny and was won by Guy Leech. With significant media attention beginning to grow, Surf Life Saving Australia established the ‘Kellogg’s Nutri-Grain Grand Prix’ in 1986.  The aim of the series was to generate a high public profile and showcase for the sport, the athletes and the surf life saving movement.

Over the years the Kellogg's Nutri-Grain Ironman Series has evolved, testing and challenging athletes through different formats and styles of racing.  While the Series has continued to evolve with varying formats, competitors and venues, one key element of Ironman and Ironwoman racing has remained – the surf. The Kellogg's Nutri-Grain Ironman Series puts Australia's top multi-discipline athletes through their paces, forcing them to take on the best and worst mother nature has to throw at them.

For almost 30 years, Kellogg's have partnered with Surf Life Saving Australia to deliver this sporting event that has not only produced some of Australia's finest and fittest athletes, but has also helped drive membership for Surf Life Saving. The Kellogg's Nutri-Grain Ironman Series and Ironwoman Series has grown to become the world's elite surf sports competition and one of summer's most iconic events – where only the best of the best have their chance to claim the prize pool, the glory and the prestige of being the crowned the Series Champion. It is survival of the fittest.

Formats
The Nutri-Grain Ironman and Ironwoman Series is contested over a various race formats which help to create an even playing field for the competitors.

Loop Format
Description: A continuous race over a conventional Ironman course, swim, board, ski and run. Each 'Loop' consists of one lap of each discipline. A race may consist of three Loops for men and two loops for women, depending on conditions and the course. The order of the disciplines in the race will vary depending on the event.

M-Shape
Description: A continuous race over a modified course, where the competitors round 3 markers, two beyond the swell, and one on the beach. A race may consist of three loops for men and two for women, depending on conditions and the course.

Triple Sprint Pursuit 
Description: Two conventional Ironman races with the combined points totals to determine handicap starting positions in a third race.  The result of the third race determines the round placings.  Introduced in Round 1 of the 2015/16 series at Coolum Beach.

Endurosurf 
Description: A 40-minute Iron race over an M-Shaped or traditional course. Each of the disciplines of swim, board, ski will be completed two or three times, with competitors taking on the surf break again and again.

Super Sprint 
Description: Three separate, 10-minute races with 5-minutes rest between each race. Equal points are allocated for races 1 and 2 with double points being awarded for the final race.

The Specialist 
Description: Four separate races, one for each discipline of swim, board, ski and run. There will be a 5-minute countdown between each race. At the conclusion of the four separate races, the final race will be conducted with a staggered start commencing from the finish arch. The athlete ranked 1st after the four Specialist races will start on ‘GO,’ with the remaining athletes then starting 2-seconds apart in sequential order in accordance to their ranking.

Eliminator (aka Survival) 
Description: Three separate, 10-12 minute long Iron races where the last five to six finishers of each race are eliminated, leaving six to eight competitors to start the final race.

WaveCross 
A 12-minute traditional iron-man race is held. The fastest 16 competitors qualify for the quarter-final stage.

The quarter-finals feature four groups of four competitors each, the discipline order is swim-board-ski, and the top two from each group qualify for the semi-finals.

The semi-finals feature two groups of four competitors each, the discipline order is board-ski-swim, and the top two from each group qualify for the final.

The final features four competitors, and the discipline order is ski-swim-board.

The format is based on the traditional course however single buoys may be utilised.

In the event that the WaveCross format cannot be run due to weather or surf conditions, SLSA will advise of an alternative format.

Points
Since the 2011/12 series, the following points awarded for each competitor per round were as follows:

Women's series results (top five)

In the 2010/11 series, Pluimers won four of the five rounds, but her 17th-place finish in the fourth round meant she finished second in the series, six points behind series winner Courtney Hancock.

Men's series results (top five)

See also

The Coolangatta Gold
Uncle Toby's Super Series

References

External links
The Nutri-Grain Ironman/Ironwoman Series 2014/2015

Lifesaving in Australia
1986 establishments in Australia
Recurring sporting events established in 1986
Australian sports television series
Nine's Wide World of Sport
Surf lifesaving